RedR (pronounced 'Red R') is an international NGO whose stated mission is to “rebuild lives in times of disaster by training, supporting, and providing aid workers to relief programmes across the world.” It was originally an acronym for Register of Engineers for Disaster Relief, although it is no longer used as such.

RedR delivers training to the humanitarian sector and their staff, enabling them to respond to the needs of disaster hit communities, efficiently and safely. In order to improve future response, RedR focuses on capacity building and disaster risk reduction for communities affected by natural and man-made disasters.

They further help to ensure that skilled professionals are always available to respond to major global emergencies through an aid worker recruitment service and by advising and training potential new relief workers.

The RedR Federation comprises several nationally accredited RedR organisations who all share a common vision and mission. These include RedR organisations in Australia, Indonesia, India, Malaysia, and UK.

History

1980s

RedR was founded in London in 1980 by engineer Peter Guthrie following time spent delivering aid during the Vietnamese Boat People Crisis. Mr. Guthrie said: “When I returned [from the refugee crisis in Malaysia] I saw the pressing need for engineers to help in this sort of work and compiled a register of engineers who could be called upon at short notice to work with frontline relief agencies.”

On the advice of Oxfam’s chief engineer Jim Howard, Oxfam provided seed funding and RedR was formally registered as a charity.

In 1985, RedR faced its first major challenge with the onset of the Ethiopian Famine. A significant number of RedR Members were required to work on relief programmes in Ethiopia and neighbouring Sudan. In 1988 The Princess Royal became President of RedR, a position she still holds today.

1990s

In 1991 RedR UK’s training programme began.

In 1992 RedR Australia was founded. It commenced with a register of engineers and then soon after began delivering training for humanitarian workers.

In 1994 the Rwanda crisis erupted and over 100 RedR Members were deployed to the Great Lakes region, while RedR New Zealand was established. A year later the first ever edition of ‘Engineering in Emergencies: A Practical Guide for Relief Workers’ by RedR Members Jan Davis and Robert Lambert was published.

In 1998 RedR launched its Technical Support Service for relief workers in the field and the following year their first regional training – Security Management - in Tirana, Albania.

2000s

In 2003 RedR UK merged with International Health Exchange (IHE), an organisation that improved the preparation and recruitment of health professionals for overseas emergency situations. RedR UK set up a programme office for the first time in East Africa.

In 2005, in response to the 2004 Indian Ocean earthquake and tsunami, RedR launched a ‘Learning Support and Capacity Building Programme’ in Sri Lanka and commenced a similar programme in Pakistan following the 2005 earthquake. In the same year RedR established a programme in Darfur, Sudan, in response to the country's civil war and trained 4,000 national and international aid workers over the next five years.

RedR UK and RedR Australia became involved in the UN Cluster approach in 2006. RedR leads the training of aid workers within a number of cluster groups, including WASH (Water, Sanitation and Hygiene), Emergency Shelter, Health and Nutrition.

In 2009 RedR UK linked with Oxford Brookes University to offer credit-rated courses in six of its training courses.

Following the 2010 Haiti earthquake, RedR established a programme and trained 1,000 relief workers to support the response. 91% of trainees were Haitian nationals. RedR Lanka was also established in its own right to help assist in long term capacity building in Sri Lanka.

In 2011 RedR UK set up a country programme in South Sudan to assist with ongoing insecurity in the region.

In 2014, University of Melbourne and University of Western Australia partnered with RedR Australia to offer the HEAT training as a credit rated course.

Starting late 2014 UK Redr took over training of UK NHS staff being deployed to Sierra Leone to respond to the Ebola Crisis in that country.

In 2015 Charles Darwin University partnered with RedR Australia to offer the EHP as a credit rated course.

RedR’s Work

Training

Though RedR started as a register of engineers for disaster relief, for over 20 years it has also delivered training for humanitarian sector and their staff worldwide.

UK Programme

RedR's UK programme delivers a range of training courses, from a basic introduction to the sector to specialist courses for professional aid workers.  RedR offers credit rated courses in partnership with Oxford Brookes University in an effort to further professionalise the humanitarian sector.

Course subjects delivered include: safety, security, logistics, shelter, WASH (Water, Sanitation & Hygiene), project management, and training of trainers.

The President of RedR UK is Princess Anne, the Princess Royal.

Australia Programme
RedR Australia manages the Australian Government's Australia Assists program, deploying technical specialists to help RedR's partners prepare for, respond to and recover from natural hazards and conflict.

RedR Australia has established three Regional Offices, with staff in Suva, Fiji; Amman, Jordan; and Bangkok, Thailand.

RedR's Australia programme also delivers a range of humanitarian training courses, including Essentials of Humanitarian Practice (EHP), Hostile Environment Awareness Training (HEAT), Humanitarian Logistics in Emergencies (HLE), Water and Sanitation in Emergencies (WASH), Child Protection in Humanitarian Action (CPHA) as well as tailor made courses for professional aid workers.  RedR offers credit rated courses in partnership with Charles Darwin University.

RedR Australia is also a Standby Partner to ten United Nations agencies including the United Nations High Commissioner for Refugees, United Nations Children's Fund, World Health Organization, World Food Programme and UN Women. They recruit and maintain a roster of international experts who can deploy to work with these UN agencies and international non-government organisations following natural disasters and complex emergencies.

Country Programmes

RedR UK has country programmes in Sudan, South Sudan, Kenya and Pakistan. These programmes have been set up in response to the ongoing humanitarian crises in these regions and the needs of the various humanitarian organisations operating there. With high levels of insecurity, there is a focus on security training for aid agencies working in the field.

Pakistan

RedR set up a new training programme in Islamabad in 2010 to support the humanitarian community within the country following the ongoing internal conflict in the North-West of the country. This follows a previous programme set up in response to the 2005 earthquake, which ran until June 2006.

Courses currently delivered focus on security management, humanitarian training and humanitarian practice and principles.

Sudan

RedR established its Sudan Programme in 2005, specialising in safety and security training for aid workers due to the ongoing conflict in Darfur. It provides Staff Welfare and Critical Incident Training to humanitarian staff to help workers move on from traumatic experiences faced in insecure environments. As well as security training, RedR delivers a range of courses aimed at improving the capacity of both local and international aid agencies.

South Sudan

RedR UK set up a new operation in South Sudan in preparation for the country's separation from Sudan in July 2011. The training programme is based in the capital Juba and is unique to the country.

East Africa

RedR UK opened its humanitarian training centre in Nairobi, Kenya in September 2011. This was in response to the Horn of Africa Food Crisis in the summer of 2011. Funds for the project were raised partly through RedR's East Africa Appeal.

Bespoke Training

RedR Australia, UK and India, provide an international bespoke training and consultancy service, covering all major aspects of humanitarian work. Disciplines include: Security Management, Personal Security, Training of Trainers for the Humanitarian Sector, Project Management in Emergencies, and Logistics.

RedR tailor their existing modules or devise new courses to meet the needs of an organisation they are training. RedR trainers go to these organisations wherever they are around the world.

Recruitment Service

RedR provides a recruitment service for aid agencies, governments and private sector companies responding to major disasters through its Member's register, which currently has a pool of about 1,700 specialists.  RedR's recruitment register focuses on all areas of the humanitarian sector, but specialises in engineering, health, logistics, security, and management consultants.

Following the 2004 Indian Ocean earthquake and tsunami, RedR provided 79 people within the first three months.
Following the 2005 Kashmir earthquake, RedR provided 80 people within the first three months.
Following Cyclone Nargis, Myanmar 2008, 140 RedR members were waiting to be deployed as and when they were needed.

Technical Support Service

RedR UK provides free online technical advice to humanitarian agencies and aid workers worldwide. This service gives access to 150 technical experts – including aid workers, academics and specialists from the corporate sector - who aim to reply to any query within 24–48 hours.

Vision, Mission and Values

RedR states its vision is a ‘world in which sufficient competent and committed personnel are available and responding to humanitarian needs.’

RedR believes in the provision of humanitarian assistance to people wherever it is needed to relieve suffering and sickness.

A key idea they integrate when responding to disasters is that people and communities affected by disasters themselves should be empowered to develop skills for immediate and future disaster response.

RedR Federation Members
RedR UK (1980)
RedR Australia (1992)
RedR India (2003)
RedR Malaysia (2005)
RedR Indonesia (2007)

References

External links
RedR UK Homepage
RedR Australia Homepage
People in Aid website
Ingenia article on the work of RedR - June 2008

Charities based in the United Kingdom
Disaster management
International organisations based in London
Organisations based in the London Borough of Lambeth